Magic Mushrooms is a platform game published in 1985 by Acornsoft for the Acorn Electron and BBC Micro home computers. It includes a built-in level editor.

Gameplay 
The objective is to guide Murphy, a beer-bellied man with a large nose, and remove all the magic mushrooms that populate the levels.

The screen has a series of green bricks on a black background. To move, the player can use the left, right and jump buttons, as well as climb ladders. Once Murphy has gathered all the mushrooms, the player must use the level's exit platform before time runs out.

There are some obstacles in the player's route: wobbly platforms which make Murphy less stable on his feet, conveyor belts which can send the character backwards or slow them, ice platforms which make Murphy slide in one direction until he reaches the end of it, glass which disintegrates under his feet, and finally some enemies that look like mutant tomatoes.

References

External links
BBC Micro Games Archive

1985 video games
Acornsoft games
BBC Micro and Acorn Electron games
BBC Micro and Acorn Electron-only games
Europe-exclusive video games
Fictional fungi
Platform games
Single-player video games
Video game level editors
Video games developed in the United Kingdom
Video games with user-generated gameplay content